Now That's What I Call Music! 24 is a music compilation that was released on March 27, 2007. The album is the 24th edition of the Now! series in the United States

It debuted at number two on the Billboard 200, selling about 230,000 copies in its first week. It experienced the lowest selling debut week for a NOW album since 2003's Now That's What I Call Music! 13, which sold 171,000 copies in its first week. The album rose to number one in its second week, selling 213,000 copies, and remained at number one in its third week, selling about 89,000 copies. It has received a Platinum certification. It has four Billboard Hot 100 number-one hits: "Say It Right", "Irreplaceable", "My Love" and "I Wanna Love You".

Track listing

Charts

Weekly charts

Year-end charts

See also
List of Billboard 200 number-one albums of 2007

References

2007 compilation albums
 024
Capitol Records compilation albums